Świerki may refer to the following places in Poland:
Świerki, Lower Silesian Voivodeship (south-west Poland)
Świerki, Łódź Voivodeship (central Poland)
Świerki, Pomeranian Voivodeship (north Poland)